Crocus paschei  is a species of Crocus from Turkey.

References

paschei
Flora of Turkey